Mount Pinafore is a prominent peak rising to about 1,100 m lying between Bartok Glacier and Sullivan Glacier situated in the northern portion of Alexander Island, Antarctica. It is located 6.27 km southeast of Lyubimets Nunatak, 9.26 km south-southeast of Kozhuh Peak, and surmounts Bartók Glacier to the northwest. The mountain is named by the United Kingdom Antarctic Place-Names Committee in 1977, in association with nearby Gilbert Glacier and Sullivan Glacier after the 1878 operetta H.M.S. Pinafore.

See also 

 Mount Ariel
 Mount Hahn
 Mount McArthur

Further reading 
 Geological Society of London, Volcano-ice Interaction on Earth and Mars, P 154
  M. J. Hambrey, W. B. Harland, Earth's Pre-Pleistocene Glacial Record, P 201
 Mary G. Chapman, Laszlo P. Keszthelyi, Preservation of Random Megascale Events on Mars and Earth: Influence on Geologic History, PP 57, 64
 Bösken, Janina. (2016), Current state of art in research about tuyas in Antarctica, British Columbia and Iceland - A literature review about the differences and similarities of tuyas, DOI: 10.13140/RG.2.2.33225.13926
 John L. Smellie, Ian P. Skilling, Products of subglacial volcanic eruptions under different ice thicknesses: two examples from Antarctica, Sedimentary Geology Volume 91, Issues 1–4, June 1994, Pages 115–129, https://doi.org/10.1016/0037-0738(94)90125-2

External links 

 Mount Pinafore on USGS website
 Mount Pinafore on SCAR website
 Mount Pinafore on mindat.org website
 Mount Pinafore on peakery.com

References 

Mount Pinafore
Mountains of Alexander Island